Suicide By My Side is the third and final album by the power metal band Sinergy, released in 2002. It shows a substantial progress in their musical style; singer Kimberly Goss performs in a sharper, more aggressive vocal style, and guitarists Alexi Laiho and Roope Latvala perform more technical solos. Goss has noted that despite the autobiographical nature of the title and the title track's lyrics, as well as suicidal comments made in the music video, she herself has never attempted suicide.

The clip at the beginning of the title track is from the stabbing scene of the film Sid and Nancy, which tells the tragic love story of Sex Pistols bassist Sid Vicious and his toxic lover.

The song "Shadow Island" is inspired by Alone in the Dark: The New Nightmare.

The last song, "Remembrance", is an instrumental dedicated to the people who died during the terrorist attacks on 11 September 2001.

Track listing

Track 12 was previously featured as a bonus track on its original release in Japan.

Credits
 Kimberly Goss - Vocals
 Alexi Laiho - Guitar, Additional Vocals (on track 8, 9), spitting (on track 1)
 Roope Latvala - Guitar
 Marko Hietala - Bass
 Tonmi Lillman - Drums

References

2002 albums
Sinergy albums
Nuclear Blast albums
Albums produced by Fredrik Nordström